Barth Jules Sussman is a novelist, screenwriter, and children's book author married to illustrator Jen Sussman.

Novels
 Shanghai (Signet - New American Library)
 Shanghai - (Amazon Kindle books / Barnes & Noble Nook Books)
 Wartime Spies of Berlin - (Amazon Kindle books / Barnes & Noble Nook Books)
 The Crooked Cross (Signet- New American Library)
 L'Homme au Boulet Rouge [editions Gallimard - France)
 Der Mann mit der Roten Kugel (Distelliteratur Verlag - Germany)

Children's books
 Muggy  Au Cirque (Hachette - France)
 Muggy Recontre Bibi (Hachette - France)
 La Journee de Muggy (Hachette - France)
 Muggy CD-ROM Coloring Book for Children - (Muggy Press)

Children's Electronic Epub Books
 Muggy the Happy Pug - A Lovely Day (Amazon Kindle Books/ Barnes & Noble Nook books )
 Muggy the Happy Pug - Muggy Meets Bibi (Amazon Kindle Books / Barnes & Noble Nook books)
 Muggy the Happy Pug - Muggy Goes to the Circus (Amazon Kindle Books / Barnes & Noble Nook books)

Historical Screenplays
 The Zaharoff Dossier -  (Amazon Kindle Books / Barnes & Noble Nook Books)
 Nick Grand of the Riviera - (Amazon Kindle Books / Barnes & Noble Nook Books)
 Gangster From Odessa -  (Amazon Kindle Books / Barnes & Noble Nook Books)
 Krupp & Mauser - (Amazon Kindle Books / Barnes & Noble Nook Books)
 Charleston & Savannah -  (Amazon Kindle Books/ Barnes & Noble Nook Books)

Screenplays
 The Stranger and the Gunfighter (1974, starring Lee Van Cleef - Columbia Pictures)
 Night Games (1980, directed by Roger Vadim - Avco Embassy)
 Save Me Cosmos Black (directed by John Pepper - American Film Institute- Los Angeles)

References

Living people
20th-century American novelists
American male novelists
American male screenwriters
20th-century American male writers
Year of birth missing (living people)